Sir Arthur Frederick Griffith (22 April 1913 – 17 November 1982) was an Australian politician, and a member of the Western Australian Legislative Assembly from 1950 until 1953 representing the seat of Canning, and a member of the Western Australian Legislative Council representing the Suburban and North Metropolitan provinces from 1953 until 1977. He served as President of the Legislative Council from May 1974 until May 1977.

Biography
Griffith was born in Geraldton, Western Australia, to George Griffith, a life insurance inspector, and Flora (née McDonald). He was educated at South Perth Primary School and at Perth Boys School. He left in 1928 at the age of 15 to take up a job in insurance, and in 1933, he became a law clerk.

On 24 June 1940, he enlisted in the Royal Australian Air Force for service in World War II. On 13 July 1940 at St Albans Church in Highgate, he married Gweneth Macaulay, with whom he later had one daughter. In 1941, he was commissioned from the ranks, and served in the Northern Territory as a Flying Officer for four weeks in late 1944. He was discharged on 5 November 1945.

Upon his return to civilian life, he became a political organiser for the newly formed Liberal Party, and at the 1950 state election, he won the seat of Canning in the Legislative Assembly. However, at the following election in February 1953, he lost it to Labor's Colin Jamieson. At a by-election four months later, he won one of the two Suburban Province seats in the Legislative Council, and served as a party whip and a member of the Library Committee, before becoming deputy chairman of committees in 1956. From 16 June 1958, he was the Coalition's most senior member in the Council.

Upon the election of the Brand-Watts government at the 1959 election, he became Minister for Mines and Housing in the new government. Upon Arthur Watts's retirement as Deputy Premier and Attorney-General on 1 February 1962, the Coalition had no lawyers amongst its ranks, so the Attorney-General role lapsed and Griffith became Minister for Justice, relying on his clerical training. He continued in these roles as well as Leader of the Government in the Legislative Council until the Government's defeat at the 1971 election.

In 1974, with 21 years' service to that chamber, he became the Father of the Legislative Council, and was elected President, a role he held for the next three years until his retirement from politics.

After his retirement, he served as a member of the Zoological Gardens Board from 1977 until 1982. He died on 17 November 1982 at Sir Charles Gairdner Hospital and was cremated at Karrakatta Cemetery.

References

1913 births
1982 deaths
Members of the Western Australian Legislative Assembly
Members of the Western Australian Legislative Council
Liberal Party of Australia members of the Parliament of Western Australia
People from Geraldton
Australian Knights Bachelor
Burials at Karrakatta Cemetery
Presidents of the Western Australian Legislative Council
20th-century Australian politicians
Royal Australian Air Force personnel of World War II
Royal Australian Air Force officers